USS Plunger has been the name of more than one United States Navy ship, and may refer to:

 USS Plunger (1897), a submarine launched in 1897, never commissioned, and cancelled in 1900
 , renamed USS A-1 in 1911, a submarine in commission from 1903 to 1905 and from 1907 to 1913
 , a submarine in commission from 1936 to 1945
 , a submarine in commission from 1962 to 1990

United States Navy ship names